Ramón Idalecio Cardozo (born 23 April 1986) is a Paraguayan professional footballer who plays as a forward.

Club career
Born in Villarrica, Guairá Department, Cardozo played most of his professional career with Tacuary. In January 2007 he was loaned to F.C. Penafiel in Portugal, being sparingly used by the second division club during his five-month spell, in an eventual eighth-place finish.

Cardozo returned to Portugal in 2013, going on to represent, always in the Primeira Liga, Vitória F.C. and Moreirense FC. Three years later he moved back to his country, signing with Deportivo Capiatá.

International career
Cardozo earned his only cap for Paraguay on 25 May 2011, coming on as a 77th-minute substitute for Pablo Zeballos in a 2–4 friendly loss against Argentina in Resistencia, Chaco.

Personal life
In spite of the same surname, a similar nickname ("Tacuarita") and physical resemblance, Cardozo was not related to Óscar Cardozo, who was also a footballer and a forward who played with team and individual success with S.L. Benfica, and was also a longtime Paraguay international.

References

External links

1986 births
Living people
People from Villarrica, Paraguay
Paraguayan footballers
Association football forwards
Paraguayan Primera División players
Club Tacuary footballers
Cerro Porteño players
Club Nacional footballers
Deportivo Capiatá players
Independiente F.B.C. footballers
Primeira Liga players
Liga Portugal 2 players
F.C. Penafiel players
Vitória F.C. players
Moreirense F.C. players
Peruvian Primera División players
León de Huánuco footballers
Crucero del Norte footballers
Paraguay international footballers
Paraguayan expatriate footballers
Expatriate footballers in Portugal
Expatriate footballers in Peru
Expatriate footballers in Argentina
Paraguayan expatriate sportspeople in Portugal
Paraguayan expatriate sportspeople in Peru
Paraguayan expatriate sportspeople in Argentina